Kilmacduagh is a small village in south County Galway, near Gort, in Ireland.  It is the site of Kilmacduagh monastery, seat of the Diocese of that name. The diocese is now part of the Diocese of Galway and Kilmacduagh in the Roman Catholic Church and in the Diocese of Tuam, Limerick and Killaloe in the Church of Ireland. The former cathedral is now a ruin.

Annalistic references

 M1199.10. John de Courcy, with the English of Ulidia, and the son of Hugo De Lacy, with the English of Meath, marched to '''Kilmacduagh to assist Cathal Crovderg O'Conor. Cathal Carragh, accompanied by the Connacians, came, and gave them battle: and the English of Ulidia and Meath were defeated with such slaughter that, of their five battalions, only two survived; and these were pursued from the field of battle to Rindown on Lough Ree, in which place John was completely hemmed in. Many of his English were killed, and others were drowned; for they found no passage by which to escape, except by crossing the lake in boats.''

See also

 List of towns and villages in Ireland

Towns and villages in County Galway
Articles on towns and villages in Ireland possibly missing Irish place names
Religion in County Galway